Indianola Municipal Airport  is a public use airport in Sunflower County, Mississippi, United States. The airport is owned by the City of Indianola and located two nautical miles (4 km) northwest of the central business district.

This airport is included in the National Plan of Integrated Airport Systems for 2011–2015, which categorized it as a general aviation facility. In 2010 the airport received a $88,997 Federal Aviation Administration Airport Improvement Program grant to rehabilitate the airport beacon and to fund the installation of a water system.

Although many U.S. airports use the same three-letter location identifier for the FAA and IATA, this airport is assigned IDL by the FAA but has no designation from the IATA.

History 
The airport was opened during World War II, and was designated as Indianola Auxiliary Field and was used as an auxiliary training airfield supporting the Army pilot training school at Greenville Army Airfield.  It was turned over for civil use in January 1947.

Facilities and aircraft 
Indianola Municipal Airport covers an area of 600 acres (243 ha) at an elevation of 126 feet (38 m) above mean sea level. It has one runway designated 18/36 with a concrete surface measuring 7,004 by 150 feet (2,135 x 46 m).

For the 12-month period ending February 8, 2012, the airport had 21,500 general aviation aircraft operations, an average of 58 per day. At that time there were 21 aircraft based at this airport: 86% single-engine and 14% multi-engine.

See also 

 Mississippi World War II Army Airfields
 List of airports in Mississippi

References

External links 
 Aerial image as of March 1992 from USGS The National Map
 
 

 

Airports in Mississippi
Transportation in Sunflower County, Mississippi
Buildings and structures in Sunflower County, Mississippi
Airfields of the United States Army Air Forces in Mississippi